Guruvayur railway station (Code: GUV) is a railway terminus situated in Guruvayur, Thrissur District, Kerala.

Overview 
The station serves as a terminal for the Guruvayur–Thrissur spur line. It also gains religious importance for its proximity to the Guruvayur Temple.

Layout 
It has four tracks and three platforms for both passenger and shunting purpose.

See also

 Annual passenger earnings details of railway stations in Kerala

References

External links

Railway stations in Thrissur district
Thiruvananthapuram railway division
Railway terminus in India
railway station